WVFN (730 AM, "The Game") is a radio station licensed to East Lansing, Michigan, broadcasting a sports format. It broadcasts on AM frequency 730 kHz and is under the ownership of Townsquare Media. 730 AM is a Mexican and Canadian clear-channel frequency.

As WVIC, AM 730 was a Top 40 music station in Lansing for many years (see also: WMMQ, current sister station and former simulcast partner).

WVFN is an affiliate of the Detroit Tigers baseball and Grand Valley State Laker football radio networks.

WVFN began broadcasting as WVIC in 1965 with a Middle-of-the-Road (MOR) format, as sister station WVIC-FM programmed a Beautiful Music format. WVIC and WVIC-FM adopted a full-time Top 40 format in 1968, competing with cross-town rivals WJIM and WILS. WVIC and WVIC-FM would simulcast the Top 40 format full-time for most of the 1970s, eventually leading WVIC-FM to beat out its AM competitors with the advantage of a 24-hour FM stereo signal. WVIC, during this time, was licensed to operate from 6:00 am to local sunset, and aired a promotional announcement at nightly sign-off, encouraging listeners to tune to WVIC-FM. WVIC made a partial break in their simulcast with WVIC-FM in 1979, airing an Urban Contemporary format during the midday, while continuing to simulcast WVIC-FM for the remainder of the broadcast day.

WVIC and WVIC-FM were purchased by Goodrich Broadcasting in August 1981, and WVIC was reprogrammed with Al Hamm's Music of Your Life format, featuring Big Band music from the 1940s, along with vocal standards from the 1950s and 1960s. Along with the format change came a call-sign change to WVGO. Less than two years later in July 1983, the Music of Your Life format was abandoned, the WVIC call-sign was restored, and the station returned to a Top 40 simulcast with WVIC-FM as "The New 73 AM". The simulcast would continue until May 1992, when the current Sports Talk format was introduced under the call-sign WVFN.

Goodrich Broadcasting changed the call-sign of WVIC to WAAP for a brief period in 1989, apparently to prevent cross-town rival WLNZ (The Ape 92) from acquiring the same call-sign (WLNZ later changed its call-sign to WGOR). There were no programming changes made to WVIC during this period.

Between 1972-1976, the original use of the WVFN (“Voice of the Forty-Niners”) call letters were assigned to a 10-watt AM carrier current campus radio station (710 kHz) at the University of North Carolina at Charlotte in Charlotte, NC.

References

Michiguide.com - WVFN History

External links

Sports radio stations in the United States
VFN
Radio stations established in 1965
CBS Sports Radio stations
Townsquare Media radio stations